Toxic Crusaders is a 1991 animated series aimed at children, loosely based on The Toxic Avenger films. It features Toxie, the lead character of the films, leading a group of misfit superheroes who combat pollution. This followed a trend of environmentally considerate cartoons and comics of the time, including Captain Planet and the Planeteers, Swamp Thing, and the Teenage Mutant Ninja Turtles Adventures, as well as cartoons based on R-rated properties like RoboCop and Police Academy. As this incarnation was aimed at children, Toxic Crusaders is considerably tamer than the edgy films it was based on (although it nevertheless contained many adult-oriented jokes that would go over most children's heads).

Thirteen episodes were produced and aired, with at least a few episodes airing as a "trial run" in Summer 1990 followed by the official debut on January 21, 1991.

It aired on YTV 1991 to 1992 in Canada. The US cable network G4 aired the first two episodes on July 25, 2009.

Overview
Prior to Toxic Crusaders, cartoons based on R-rated (under-17s must be accompanied) films had indeed been attempted with programs like Rambo: The Force of Freedom. However, the content of the Toxic Avenger films was arguably more controversial than many such films, featuring strong sexual content in addition to intense violence. Created by New York-based Troma, Inc., a company famous for such low-budget classic films as Chopper Chicks in Zombietown, Class of Nuke 'Em High, and Sgt. Kabukiman, NYPD, the animated Toxic Crusaders departed significantly from its live-action source.

The Toxic Avenger film series starred Melvin Junko, a scrawny nerd who, through exposure to toxic waste, was mutated into a "hideously deformed creature of superhuman size and strength." In the films, "Toxie" took his revenge on industrial America by means of gory violence and bloodbaths. True to Troma's reputation, other R-rated material abounded as well.

Only thirteen syndicated episodes of Toxic Crusaders were produced, but like the feature films, the episodes became cult favorites, spawning a string of merchandising.

Plot
Toxic Crusaders cleaned up Toxie's act considerably. Toxie was still a grotesque mutant endowed with superhuman powers, but underneath it all, he was a good-hearted, law-abiding citizen of the fictional town of Tromaville, New Jersey (the setting of most of Troma Entertainment's films). Another change from the films was that the toxic waste also mutated his mop into a sentient being that would sometimes battle enemies by itself or motion to Toxie ideas on how to solve problems. The villains were still polluters, albeit polluters from a different world. Hailing from the planet Smogula, Czar Zosta, Dr. Killemoff, and Psycho wreaked ecological havoc with the help of Tromaville's corrupt Mayor Grody. Bonehead, a street punk who bullied Melvin, joins them in the first episode.

Dr. Killemoff and Czar Zosta were cockroach-like extraterrestrials from the planet Smogula, which is a world where pollution is natural as fresh air and water is natural to Earth. Natives of Smogula thrive on pollution and need it to survive. For unexplained reasons, Czar Zosta and other Smogulans were able to withstand Earth's atmosphere without problems while Dr. Killemoff wears a breathing apparatus to survive. Dr. Killemoff, like most villains, also had a seemingly endless army of foot soldiers called Radiation Rangers.

Other villains and heroes made their appearances on the show with equally ridiculous origins as the Crusaders. Few if any of these characters made more than one appearance.

Characters

Toxic Crusaders 
 Toxie (voiced by Rodger Bumpass) – The main protagonist of the series. Originally a meek and quirky janitor at a health club named Melvin Junko, who was often toyed with by Bimbette and her friends. When they played a trick on Melvin, which involved him wearing a tutu, he ran in embarrassment and ended up stumbling into a drum filled with toxic waste. Instead of killing him, however, the toxic waste transformed him into a grotesque green-skinned mutant with athletic attributes. Melvin would change his name to Toxie. His weapon of choice was a superpowered mop (named quite appropriately Mop), which had a mind of its own, as it was also exposed to the toxic chemicals.
 Nozone (voiced by Paul Eiding) – No-Zone was originally a test pilot who flew through a hole in the ozone layer and crashed into a silo of radioactive pepper. He gained the appearance of a blue-skinned humanoid with a wheel for a right foot and powerful sneezes emitted from his enormous nose.
 Major Disaster (voiced by Ed Gilbert) – Major Disaster was originally a military soldier who gained the ability to control plants after falling into a radioactive swamp.
 Headbanger – A fusion of two opposing personalities into a two-headed body made up of Dr. Bender (voiced by Hal Rayle), the cantankerous mad scientist for the right half, and Fender (voiced by John Mariano), the surfer-like singing telegram boy, for the left half. The Fender part was responsible for the accident where they fell into the atom-smasher and got joined into one body. Bender mutated into a green creature akin to Toxie, but Fender retained his human appearance. Headbanger originally worked with Dr. Killemoff when it came to his plot to put chemicals in the food at a fast food restaurant, but defected to Toxie's side after seeing that girls preferred the Toxic Crusaders.
 Junkyard (voiced by Gregg Berger) – Junkyard was originally a junkyard dog and a homeless man who took shelter in Junkyard's kennel, which was covered in toxic waste, when lightning struck it and merged them together into one humanoid dog. He joined up with the Toxic Crusaders upon helping them fight Dr. Killemoff's forces at the time when Dr. Killemoff disguised Island City as a resort.

Villains 
 Czar Zosta (voiced by Patric Zimmerman) – One of the primary villains of the series and the ruler of Smogula. Czar Zosta is a small bug-like Smogulan who is Dr. Killemoff's boss.
 Dr. Killemoff (voiced by Rodger Bumpass) – One of the primary villains of the series. He comes from the planet Smogula. Dr. Killemoff wears a breathing apparatus (which resembled a mask giving him a somewhat human appearance) in order to survive on non-polluted worlds. Two recurring gags involving Killemoff are that he always corrects someone when they only refer to him as Killemoff by shouting "That's DR. Killemoff" and that he never listens to Psycho's predictions despite the fact that they could help him succeed.
 Psycho (voiced by Michael J. Pollard) – An obese bio-mechanical being that had an uncanny ability to guess the future which was a key point in the TV show where his guesses would end up as the spoiler to how Dr. Killemoff's plans would fail.
 Bonehead (voiced by Hal Rayle) – Bonehead was a bullying Earth punk who was one of the gang who laughed at Melvin's tutu incident. He later attempts to fight Toxie who confronted him and his buddies for trying to take Yvonne's accordion. In self-defense, Toxie throws him into a barrel of acid rain in the first episode resulting in his near-skeletal appearance. Bonehead then joins forces with Dr. Killemoff. He was mostly brainless and incompetent. He is based on Bozo from the first movie.
 Mayor Max Grody (voiced by Chuck McCann) – The corrupt Mayor of Tromaville who is allied with the Smogulans. He is based on Mayor Peter Belgoody from the first movie.
 Mona (voiced by Susan Blu) – Mayor Grody's secretary.
 Polluto – A living oil slick monster created by Dr. Killemoff. Toxie managed to destroy Polluto in "The Maxing of Toxie" by having No-Zone sneeze a pile of cat litter on Polluto which caused it to explode. In "Club Fred," Polluto was recreated and unleashed on the Toxic Crusaders. The Toxic Crusaders threw large antacid pills which caused Polluto to dissolve.
 General GarBage – A Smogulan general who appeared in "Invasion of the Biddy Snatchers." He was called in by Czar Zostas to replace Dr. Killemoff. His plot involved having his infiltrators taking over the elderly citizens of Tromaville by biting them and becoming a four-armed clone of the elderly citizens. This plan went into action with some of the victims being Mrs. Junko and Mayor Grody's mother. When Dr. Killemoff is surprised that General GarBage's plan is actually working, he states to Psycho and Bonehead that they will be out of a job resulting in Dr. Killemoff having to call the Toxic Crusaders for help. With help from Toxie's mom and the other elderly citizens, the Toxic Crusaders ended up defeating the clones with the elderly citizens using their hair spray to regress the clones back to normal form. General GarBage then appeared and unleashed the Radiation Rangers on the Toxic Crusaders. Under the idea of his mop, Toxie uses the hair spray to shrink General GarBage causing him to retreat back to Smogula.
 Radiation Rangers – A bunch of hunched-over mutants in yellow hazmat suits and intimidating gas masks that serve as Dr. Killemoff's foot soldiers.

Other characters 
 Blobbie – Toxie's pet which resembles a little blob of goo. Toxie first met Blobbie when he first arrived in the toxic waste dump
 Yvonne (voiced by Kath Soucie in a Bronx accent) – Toxie's buxom blonde girlfriend. Yvonne is often playing the accordion and singing soprano so high that it would break things, but Toxie is too polite to criticize her about it. One time the show literally broke the fourth wall in the form of Yvonne's singing causing the viewer's TV to break (in the form of animated broken glass), and Toxie apologizing to the viewer and saying the Toxic Crusaders will come by to buy them new TV sets. She is based on Toxie's blind girlfriend Sarah from the movies, yet Yvonne is nearsighted.
 Mrs. Junko (voiced by Susan Silo in a Brooklyn accent) – Toxie's mother.
 Lloyd – A friend of the Toxic Crusaders. A joke about him in this series is that his wife and children also had the same full beard as he did.
 Snailman – Crash Shelby is a race car driver who careened off a bridge into a barge full of snails where the engine oil merged him with a snail. He once helped the Toxic Crusaders fight Dr. Killemoff and Czar Zosta.
 Mower Man – Mower Man was originally a gardener who took a nap in a garden shed that happened to contain leaking gardening chemicals, which exploded in the heat of the day and made him into a half-man, half gardening equipment hybrid or as he preferred: "A hideously deformed creature of superhuman shears and strength." He once worked with Dr. Killemoff in a plot that involved Weed Monsters. After being fired for accidentally mowing the Weed Monsters, Mower Man was last seen applying for a job in the want ads to help Mayor Grody destroy incriminating evidence.

Episode list

Crew
 Cindy Akers – Assistant Dialogue Director
 Susan Blu – Dialogue Director

Other media
Marvel Comics released an eight-issue comic book series. It had no regular writer. Each issue was written by such notables as Steve Gerber (issues #3 and #5), Ann Nocenti (issue #7), David Leach and Jeremy Banx (lead strip script and artwork) and David Michelinie (back up strip) (issue #8), Hilary Barta (issue #2), and Simon Furman (issues #1, 4, and 6). A four book mini series was written and drawn by David Leach & Jeremy Banx. The series was solicited and the first issue written and drawn before being canceled along with all of Marvel TV tie-in titles. One issue was a direct parody of Captain Planet and the Planeteers. Issue #8 was the only mainstream US comic book ever published to carry an 'Approved by the Comic Code Authority' stamp while at the same time featuring a man sat on a toilet defecating.

In the UK, Fleetway published their own Toxic Crusaders comic book which would last for ten issues.

Playmates Toys, the same company responsible for Ninja Turtles action figures, released a line of similarly styled Toxic Crusader figures in 1991. The majority of characters featured bright neon colors and glow-in-the-dark accessories. TV commercials for the figures used the tag line "They're gross, but they still get girls!" A total of nine characters as well as some rather unorthodox vehicles saw toy shelves. Similar to the Ninja Turtles' Retromutagen Ooze, Playmates also marketed a canister of slime labeled Toxie's Toxic Waste. The toy line was principally conceived by Aaronian and the design team at Troma and Pangea Corporation. Some of the toys came packed with "Toxic Tips," which instructed kids how to make messes in their homes and otherwise muck up the environment. Similarly to the development of The Teenage Mutant Ninja Turtles, Pangea Corporation provided much of the original design, packaging, and logo development. Additionally, John Schulte and John Besmehn, worked in tandem on story premises with veteran writer and show runner, Jack Mendelsohn, and scriptwriter, Chuck Lorre.

Other tie-in products included coloring books, junior novels, Halloween costumes, Colorforms, Topps trading cards, a board game, a card game, and puzzles. Video games of the same name were also produced by Bandai and Sega, which were released on the Nintendo Entertainment System, Game Boy, and Sega Genesis. A Super NES version was planned by Bandai around at the same time with the NES and Game Boy versions but it was cancelled for unknown reasons. A new beat-em-up game based on the series, developed and published by Retroware, is planned for release on Steam and consoles sometime in 2023.

Several years later, Troma released two Toxic Crusaders DVDs. The first was Toxic Crusaders: The Movie which consisted of the first three episodes of the series spliced together to form one story. The second release, Toxic Crusaders: Volume 1, is a collection of the first four episodes. A box set, featuring all 13 episodes and all four Toxic Avenger movies, was released on April 29, 2008.

Troma was in talks to make a live action version of Toxic Crusaders at New Line Cinema. In Lloyd Kaufman's first book, "All I Need to Know about Filmmaking I Learned from The Toxic Avenger", he claims that New Line did not live up to their end of the contract and the film was not made. Kaufman has speculated that New Line bought the rights because they were in negotiations to make the sequels to the Teenage Mutant Ninja Turtles movie and wanted to use the Toxic Crusaders movie as leverage against the owners of the rights to Teenage Mutant Ninja Turtles. Troma sued New Line Cinema and was awarded an undisclosed amount in damages.

References

External links
 Retrojunk – Toxic Crusaders
 
 Playmates: Toxic Crusaders: Action Figures at www.figure-archive.net
 Playmates: Toxic Crusaders: Vehicles at www.figure-archive.net

1990s American animated television series
1991 comics debuts
1991 American television series debuts
1991 American television series endings
Action figures
American children's animated adventure television series
American children's animated superhero television series
First-run syndicated television programs in the United States
YTV (Canadian TV channel) original programming
Environmental television
Playmates Toys
Animated television shows based on films
The Toxic Avenger (franchise)
1990s toys
Troma Entertainment films
English-language television shows
Television shows set in New Jersey
Television shows adapted into comics
Television shows adapted into video games
Comedy franchises